

Aviation 

 Fredericton International Airport, formerly Greater Fredericton Airport
 Gliding Federation of Australia, the governing body of gliding in Australia
 ICAO designator for Gulf Air, a Bahraini airline

Politics 

 Assyria Liberation Party, an Assyrian nationalist organization
 Good Friday Agreement of 1998 concerning Northern Ireland

Sport 

Association football
 GFA F.C., a Burmese football club 
 G.F.A. Cup, a football competition in Gozo, Malta
 Girls Football Academy, a Lebanese former women's football club
 Gozo Football Association
 Gambia Football Association
 Ghana Football Association
 Gibraltar Football Association
 Gloucestershire County Football Association, in England
 Goa Football Association, in India
 Gozo Football Association, in Malta
 Grenada Football Association
 Guam Football Association
 Guernsey Football Association

Other sports
 Gliding Federation of Australia

Other uses 
 George French Angas, English/Australian naturalist and artist
 GFA BASIC, a programming language
 Glasgow Filmmakers Alliance, a Scottish trade directory 
 "Goodbye, Farewell and Amen", the finale of the television series M*A*S*H
 Gospel for Asia, a Christian missionary organization
 Greens Farms Academy, in Connecticut, United States, 
 Georgia Film Academy, not-for-profit film/television program based in Atlanta, Georgia
 Gross floor area
 Guitar Foundation of America, an American music organization
 Guldfågeln Arena, the home arena of Swedish football team Kalmar FF